Events from the year 1790 in Canada.

Incumbents
Monarch: George III

Governors
Governor of the Canadas: Guy Carleton, 1st Baron Dorchester
Governor of New Brunswick: Thomas Carleton
Governor of Nova Scotia: John Parr
Commodore-Governor of Newfoundland: John Elliot
Governor of St. John's Island: Edmund Fanning

Events
 British Captain George Vancouver begins his three-year survey of northwest coast of North America 
 Spain signs the Nootka Convention, ceding the Pacific Northwest to England and the United States.
 October 7 New York consents to Vermont's admission to the Union, with cessation of New York's jurisdiction, in the disputed territory.
 Lower Canada is divided into three districts, instead of two.

Births

Deaths

 
Canada
91
Canada
1790s in Canada
Years in Canada